The Zayan barbel (Luciobarbus zayanensis) is a species of cyprinid fish endemic to Morocco found in the  Oum Er-Rbia River basin.

References 

Zayan barbel
Endemic fauna of Morocco
Freshwater fish of North Africa
Zayan barbel